To Dorothy a Son is a black and white 1954 British gentle comedy film in the form of a farce directed by Muriel Box and starring Shelley Winters, John Gregson and Peggy Cummins. Known in the U.S. as Cash on Delivery, it is based on the 1950 play To Dorothy, a Son by Roger MacDougall which had enjoyed a lengthy run in the West End. It was shot at Elstree Studios near London with sets designed by the art director George Provis. It was distributed in America by RKO Pictures in January 1956.

Premise

Tony Rapallo, a composer, is married (or so he thinks) and his wife Dorothy is pregnant and expecting their child. All is thrown into confusion when his first wife Myrtle appears from America claiming that they are still married. However, her motivation is not to get Tony back, but to ensure she is the recipient of a $2 million inheritance from her New Yorker uncle, Uncle Joe. This will states that if a son is born to Tony before 9am on a certain day then the son will inherit the money, if not then Myrtle inherits all. Myrtle therefore hopes the birth will e after 9am.

It gets more complicated when the lawyer explains Tony and Myrtle were never legally married in the first place because they were married in Tonga and although they thought they had been there 7 days they had only been six due to the International Date Line and therefore fell short of the minimum stay before marriage was permitted.

When 9am passes she celebrates but Tony is more concerned about the baby. However, he suddenly realises the will meant 9am New York time: five hours more. With 15 minutes to go and Myrtle in tow, a baby starts to cry. After brief celebration it seems it is a girl so Myrtle still gets the money, but it is twins and the second child born with seconds to go is a boy. Tony wants to be generous and offers Myrtle half thge money which she accepts. When she calls her boyfriend he says it is 10am not 9am because they are on Summer Time. So Myrtle is entitled to all the money., She decides to give Tony half.

Cast

 Shelley Winters as Myrtle La Mar
 John Gregson as Tony Rapallo
 Peggy Cummins as Dorothy Rapallo
 Wilfrid Hyde-White as Mr Starke the lawyer 
 Mona Washbourne as Cymbeline Appleby the midwife
 Hal Osmond as Livingstone Potts
 Hartley Power as Cy Daniel
 Maurice Kaufmann as Elmer,  Myrtle's boyfriend 
 John Warren as Waiter
 Fred Berger as Furrier
 Dorothy Bramhall as Starke's secretary
 Nicholas Parsons as Passport Official
 Ronald Adam as Parsons
 Martin Miller as Brodcynsky
 Alfie Bass as Cab Driver
 Anthony Oliver as Express Reporter
 Joan Sims as Telephone Operator
 Aubrey Mather as Dr. Cameron
 Meredith Edwards as Mr Carter, the landlord
 Campbell Singer as 	Pub Landlord
 Marjorie Rhodes as Landlady
 Charles Hawtrey as Waiter at Pub
 Joan Newell as Mrs. Robinson
 Bartlett Mullins as 	Mechanic 
 Gudrun Ure as Cy Daniel's Secretary
 Grace Denbeigh-Russell as Spinster 
 Charles Hammond as 'Express' Photographer
 John Warren as Waiter

Critical reception
TV Guide described the film as "a time-zone comedy, with Winters leading a British cast to give the film US appeal...None of it is terribly interesting" ; whereas The New York Times wrote, "BELIEVE it or not, the running time of a stork determines the heir or heiress to $2,000,000 in Cash on Delivery, a bright, British farce that was fun on delivery at the Little Carnegie yesterday...Shelley Winters, as Myrtle, is in one of those made-to-order roles. John Gregson, as Tony, and Peggy Cummins, as Dorothy, are fine. And Mona Washbourne makes a delightfully tart nurse. Deliver yourself to the Little Carnegie. You'll have a good time."

References

External links

Review of film at Variety

1954 films
1954 comedy films
British films based on plays
Films directed by Muriel Box
British comedy films
Films with screenplays by Peter Rogers
Films produced by Peter Rogers
British black-and-white films
Films shot at British National Studios
1950s English-language films
1950s British films